The Arizona gray squirrel (Sciurus arizonensis) is a tree squirrel, in the genus Sciurus, endemic to the canyons and valleys surrounded by deciduous and mixed forests in eastern Arizona and northern Mexico.

It is threatened by habitat loss. The only other large squirrel that is within its range is Abert's squirrel, which has ear tufts and lives in pine forests. Although they act and look like other gray squirrels, the Arizona gray squirrel is actually more closely related to the fox squirrel.

Phylogeny and description
Sciurus arizonensis is a member of the order Rodentia and the family Sciuridae. It is distinguishable from Sciurus aberti by its longer flatter skull, broader rostrum, and having only one molar instead of two. S. arizonensis also has smaller ears with no tufts and a red/black stripe on the underside of their tail. Some sexual dimorphism can be seen in these squirrels, but it varies with some populations having larger males, and other populations having larger females.

Distribution and habitat
Sciurus arizonensis or the Arizona gray squirrel can be found in parts of Arizona, New Mexico and Sonora, Mexico. They live in the mountains at mid-elevations in riparian habitats, usually broadleaf riparian habitats.
The Arizona gray squirrel has had no recent expansion or reduction in the size of their range in New Mexico, though there has been some population decline. This is due to habitat loss and the introduction of Abert’s squirrel, which has in some cases outcompeted the Arizona gray squirrel for resources.

Diet
The Arizona gray squirrel's diet consists mainly of pine cones, acorns, and other nuts. They also eat seeds and berries.

Reproduction
Arizona gray squirrels have large variations in their diet, which has led to reproduction rates that vary year by year. Not all females breed each year, which can be seen by a lack of placental scarring. The timing of Arizona gray squirrel mating correlates with the prime time for flowers, which are a high energy food source for the energetically expensive costs of mating. Because mating is so energetically expensive, optimal reproduction timing is very important to ensure that offspring and parent will survive. This timing can differ between sexes and is largely dependent on the environmental change present in their habitat, which can often be fluctuating throughout the year and from year to year. Differences in the parental investment and a lack of food are responsible for shifts in male and female ranges. The opposite sexes have ranges that overlap with each other and during good mating conditions or season these ranges will expand and overlap more.
These squirrels have been observed in mating chases with many males chasing one female.
An important conservation strategy for the survival of the Arizona gray squirrel is to protect their nesting habitat. This means maintaining large trees with closed canopies that allow access to resources and protection from predators.

References

Arizona gray squirrel
Mammals of Mexico
Mammals of the United States
Rodents of North America
Fauna of the Southwestern United States
Arizona gray squirrel
Mammals described in 1867
Taxonomy articles created by Polbot